Petrophile megalostegia is a species of flowering plant in the family Proteaceae and is endemic to southwestern Western Australia. It is a shrub with needle-shaped or flattened, sometimes S-shaped leaves with a sharply-pointed tip, and more or less cylindrical heads of silky-hairy, yellow to cream-coloured flowers.

Description
The flowers are arranged on the ends of branchlets in more or less spherical heads surrounded by glabrous egg-shaped or elliptic involucral bracts.

Taxonomy
Petrophile megalostegia was first formally described in 1876 by Ferdinand von Mueller in the Fragmenta Phytographiae Australiae from material collected by James Drummond. The specific epithet (megalostegia) means "large roof, tent or house" referring to the involucral bracts.

Distribution and habitat
This petrophile is found between Mullewa, Eneabba and Watheroo where it grows in heath and shrubland in the Avon Wheatbelt, Geraldton Sandplains and Swan Coastal Plain biogeographic regions of southwestern Western Australia.

Conservation status
Petrophile incurvata is classified as "not threatened" by the Western Australian Government Department of Parks and Wildlife.

References

megalostegia
Eudicots of Western Australia
Endemic flora of Western Australia
Plants described in 1876
Taxa named by Ferdinand von Mueller